Kunguma Chimil is a 1985 Indian Tamil-language film starring Mohan, Ilavarasi, Revathi and Chandrasekhar. It was released on 23 August 1985.

Plot 

From Coimbatore to Chennai, via Kargudi, in 1985...

Two provincial orphans, companions in their misfortune (without money, unemployed and without place of residence), from their first and picturesque meeting (in the bus which brought them towards the Tamil Nadu capital), Ravi (Mogan) and Philomena (Ilavarasi) eventually fell for each other.

She, a practising catholic and nurse, was mistreated, then threatened with death by her fatal foster father, because she surprised him, swindling his partner in affairs, the good and generous David (V. Gopalakrishnan).

He was warned in time by Philomena, who paid a very high price for her honesty, because in reprisals, her family decided to eliminate her.
It is at this very moment that Philomena fled, so escaping her murderer and came to take refuge where Ravi was.

Together, thus, upon their arrival in Madras, they squat successively in an old railway goods wagon, hunted by the railroad authorities, or in an immense ruined and neglected building.

Ravi, although awarded a diploma, finds no employment in the big city. He resigns to become a driver of a rickshaw...

One day, Philomena comes face to face with Ravi. She finds it degrading that he is reduced to this job, while he possesses all the qualities to obtain a more gratifying job, as high as his ambitions.

It is then, contrary to all expectations, that a supervisor's post is available in the forest region of Kargudi, but it is subject to a condition: the deposit of a large sum of money (10,000 rupees), and he has only 72 hours. Ravi is distraught.

Ravi improvises in being discreetly embedded in a marriage of the neighbourhood, for the free food. Accompanied with Philomena, together, they are surprised and thrown out by the guests.

This sad and distressing experience makes them the terrible precariousness of their situation understood. Philomena, who feels guilty, decides to part from Ravi, during six months, considering herself a burden, the time when he finds a decent job. She promises to return to him after this lapse of time, in the letter which she sent before leaving him.

While being at it, Philomena, wanting to save a little girl, is knocked down by the biggest of the fates, by David's vehicle.

Whereas Ravi, aboard a bus, finds an enormous sum of money. After careful consideration, he decides to use the money found to pay the guarantee of his future work.

Upon his arrival, he gets acquainted with a strange character, Manikkum (Delhi Ganesh), who forces him to take the hand of his daughter.

The man is mentally disturbed since the marriage of his unique daughter, Rukumani (Revathi) (also called Ruku) broke off, for lack of not having been able to honour the dowry, the sum of which it was lost in a bus, recently.

It turns out that Ruku works for Ravi, as a maid. She turns out to be very naive and very awkward, causing enormous concerns to Ravi, who reprimands her severely every time.

In the capital, Philomena tells of her setbacks to David. Together, they go to meet Ravi, but on the spot, they realise that the young man is not there any more.

David has to leave to Kargudi for his business and leave only Philomena...

Fate wants that Ravi work in David's forest domain. Both men meet and appreciate mutually. David recommends expressly to Ravi to take back Ruku to his service department. Indeed, she was dismissed, some time previously, by Ravi, because of her clumsiness.

She, who came to give back to Ravi, his wallet lost a little earlier, just catches up. The young woman succumbs to her rescuer.

Sekhar, (Chandrasekhar), son of big family, who passed by Kargudi, breaks down with his car. While he looks for some water, he meets Ruku and is in love with her on first sight. He went to the girl's chosen by his parents, whom he gives up definitively. On his return, he quarrels with his father who wants to disinherit him because of the refusal of the arranged marriage, Sekhar outstrips him by abandoning everything, for the beautiful eyes of Ruku and leave his cozy nest.

Following a new thoughtlessness of Ruku, Ravi slap her in front of her father, Manikkum. This one, made sick of life, explains to him his failures, in particular, when he lost an enormous sum of money in a bus, among others.

Ravi makes the link with the sum which he found formerly, and detects that he is bound to the misfortunes of Ruku and his father. He regrets bitterly his attitude past with them, in the point to express it to his boss, David. The latter makes it understood to Ravi, that he is not there accidentally and that he could marry Ruku, in repair of damages. But Ravi answers to him that another woman waits for him (by thinking of Philomena, of course!). A little later, Ruku saves in turn Ravi, from an elephant. Chased by wild animal, they take refuge at the top of a watchtower, planned for that purpose, for a whole night. It is in the early hours that the pachyderm goes away.

Regrettably, the wrong languages already make good progress in the village further to this episode, to the point that Ravi has to marry Ruku, avoid him the dishonor, as well as to her poor father, again.

Thus the preparations for the marriage are thrown ...

Sekhar sends to Rukku the congratulations of circumstances, with a lot of bitterness.

From his part, Ravi understands, almost too late, also, that the person that he conversed regularly with by telephone, was none other than Philomena, thanks to words which she, only, usually pronounced: ... Oru Bhagavad Gita-laiyo, oru Quran-laiyo, oru Bible-laiyo, ippadithan oru sambavam nadakanuna adhu maaththa yaaraalum mudiyathu! ... He immediately warns David who quite returned it, upset.

But Ravi is anxious to marry Ruku, but without the presence of Philomena (who was invited at the request of David, before the rich man knows about all the affair). Regrettably, Ruku who was there, hears everything.

And David who had to prevent Philomena from attending the marriage, is already heading for Kargudi, his plane lands in a few hours. In the car, which returns her instead of the ceremony, she finds on the seat a file, forgotten the day before, by Ravi. She understands while the bridegroom is none other than her Ravi.

Terrified, she asks to the driver to accelerate so that she arrives in time, so that she can prevent Ravi and Ruku's marriage. Once there, it is with surprise that she notices that Ravi waited for her. Indeed, Ruku decided otherwise and decided by mutual agreement, to get married, with the man who left quite behind him, for her, by love, Sekhar. Whereas now married, also, for ever, Ravi and Philomena savour every second of their common existence...

... Oru Bhagavad Gita-laiyo, oru Quran-laiyo, oru Bible-laiyo, ippadithan oru sambavam nadakanuna adhu maaththa yaaraalum mudiyathu! ...

(...Whether in the Bhagavad Gita, whether in the Quran, whether in the Bible, if a situation of this kind has to take place, nobody can change it !...)

Cast 
Mohan as Ravi
Ilavarasi as Philomena "Philo"
Revathi as Rukumani "Ruku
Chandrasekhar as Sekhar
Delhi Ganesh as Manikkum, Ruku's father
V. Gopalakrishnan as David
Senthil
Loose Mohan as Ganesan
Typist Gopu as Manager
Pasi Narayanan as Narayanan
Sivaraman
Bayilvan Ranganathan

Soundtrack 
Music was composed by Ilaiyaraaja and lyrics written by Vaali and Gangaï Amaran. The song "Nilavu Thoongum" is set in Mohanam raga.

Reception 
Jayamanmadhan of Kalki praised the film for Ilaiyaraaja's music and the cinematography.

References

External links 
 

1980s Tamil-language films
1985 films
Films directed by R. Sundarrajan
Films scored by Ilaiyaraaja
Films shot in Ooty